Alexander Young (died 1684) was a Scottish bishop.

Life

Young was born in Aberdeen, in the year 1629. He became a minister in the Scottish Church, but his training is unclear. At this time King Charles was imposing bishops upon the Scottish Church, which the majority opposed. These were troubled times in the Scottish Church which eventually resulted in the Scottish Episcopalians Act of 1711 effectively splitting the church.  

In 1664 he was translated as minister of Dalmeny to minister of Cramond Kirk. In 1666 he moved to the Archdeaconry of St Andrews.

In the winter of 1671, he became Bishop of Edinburgh, a position he held until his translation to be Bishop of Ross in 1679. This had been arranged by the Duchess of Lauderdale in order to allow John Paterson, Bishop of Galloway (not John Paterson, Young's predecessor at Ross) to hold the Diocese of Edinburgh. Young suffered from an ailment and in 1684 travelled to France to have an operation. He failed to survive the operation and died several weeks afterwards.

References

 Keith, Robert, An Historical Catalogue of the Scottish Bishops: Down to the Year 1688, (London, 1824)

Year of birth unknown
1684 deaths
Bishops of Edinburgh (pre-1689)
Bishops of Ross (Scotland)
Scottish Restoration bishops
Clergy from Aberdeen
Members of the Parliament of Scotland 1669–1674
Members of the Convention of the Estates of Scotland 1678
Members of the Parliament of Scotland 1681–1682
Alexander